The 1919 Connecticut Aggies football team represented Connecticut Agricultural College, now the University of Connecticut, in the 1919 college football season. The Aggies were led by first year head coach Roy J. Guyer, and completed the season with a record of 2–6. There was no team in 1917 or 1918 due to World War I. After the first game against New Hampshire, Aggie junior Gardner Dow died of injuries from a tackle he delivered in the fourth quarter. The school would name the Athletic Fields on which many sports competed for him.

Schedule

References

Connecticut
UConn Huskies football seasons
Connecticut Aggies football